A vehicle explosion is the destruction of, or damage to, a vehicle caused by an explosion.  They may be caused by an accident or be used as a weapon.

Use as a weapon

Car bomb

A car bomb is an improvised explosive device that is placed in a car or other vehicle and then exploded.  It is commonly used as a weapon of assassination, terrorism, or guerrilla warfare, to kill the occupant(s) of the vehicle and people near the blast site and/or to cause damage to buildings or other property.  Car bombs act as their own delivery mechanisms and can carry a relatively large amount of explosive material without attracting suspicion. Trucks are most commonly used, although motorcycles and even bicycles have also been used to carry bombs.  They are sometimes for a suicide attack.

The earliest car bombs were intended for assassination.  These were often wired to the car's ignition system, to explode when the car was started.  Ignition triggering is now rare, as it is easy to detect and hard to install – interfering with the circuitry is time-consuming and car alarms can be triggered by drains on the car's electrical system. Also, the target can start the car remotely (inadvertently or otherwise), or the target may be a passenger who is a safe distance away when the ignition starts.  It is now more common for assassination bombs to be affixed to the underside of the car and then detonated remotely, by the car's motion, or by other means.  The bomb is exploded as the target approaches or starts the vehicle or, more commonly, after the vehicle begins to move, when the target is more likely to be inside. For this reason, guards often check the underside of vehicles with a long mirror mounted on a pole.

Kamikaze

Kamikaze is a word of Japanese origin, which in the English language usually refers to suicide attacks carried out by Imperial Japan's military aviators against Allied ships towards the end of the Pacific campaign of World War II, by crashing their explosive-filled planes into warships to stop and block the advancement of Allied shipping towards the Japanese archipelago.  Air attacks were the predominant and best-known aspect of a wider use of – or plans for – suicide attacks by Japanese personnel, including soldiers carrying explosives, and boat crews, in WW2 Japan thought Suicide was the honorable way to die. (see Japanese Special Attack Units). 

Since the end of the war, in 1945, the word kamikaze has sometimes been used as a pars pro toto for other kinds of attack in which an attacker is deliberately sacrificed. These include a variety of suicide attacks, in other historical contexts, such as the proposed use of Selbstopfer aircraft by Nazi Germany and various suicide bombings by terrorist organisations around the world, such as the September 11, 2001 attacks.

Car explosions in film and television
Many films and television programs overdramatise car explosions, showing them as being far more likely than they actually are. Cars in these media frequently explode after a crash or when being hit by bullets. This was debunked in the 2009 season of MythBusters.

See also
Accidents and incidents in aviation
Catastrophic kill

References 

Explosions
Transport accidents and incidents